Conca Casale is a comune (municipality) in the Province of Isernia in the Italian region Molise, located about  west of Campobasso and about  southwest of Isernia.

Conca Casale borders the following municipalities: Pozzilli, San Vittore del Lazio, Venafro, Viticuso.

References

Cities and towns in Molise